Rhabdopleura recondita is a sessile hemichordate. It is a suspension feeder that secretes tubes on the ocean floor. It is found in the Adriatic and Ionian Seas.

Distribution
Specimens of R. recondita were collected off the coast of Lecce Province in southeastern Italy.

Bryozoan hosts
Beli et al. (2018) found R. recondita living on bryozoan hosts, namely Myriapora truncata, Schizoretepora serratimargo, Celleporina caminata, and Reptadeonella violacea.

References

recondita
Animals described in 2018
Fauna of the Mediterranean Sea
Fauna of Italy